Mermaids is a 1986 coming-of-age novel by American writer Patty Dann, published in 1986 by Ticknor and Fields. Its plot follows a 14-year-old girl growing up with a wayward single mother in 1960s New England. It was adapted into a feature film of the same name in 1990, starring Cher and Winona Ryder.

Background
Dann, a graduate of the University of Oregon and Columbia University, was working as a secretary in 1984, having abandoned her career aspiration of becoming a writer. In 1986, while working as a secretary for A&E, she began revising Mermaids, a period piece coming-of-age novel about a teenage girl set in the 1960s, a draft of which she had submitted as her MFA thesis. During the redrafting process, she changed the narrative perspective from third-person to first-person. After completing the redrafting of the novel, Dann found a literary agent who sold the novel to Ticknor and Fields, who published it in 1986.

Adaptation
In 1990, Richard Benjamin directed a critically acclaimed feature film adaptation of the novel, starring Cher and Winona Ryder.

References

External links

1986 American novels
American bildungsromans
American novels adapted into films
Novels set in the 1960s
Novels set in Massachusetts
Fiction set in 1963
1986 debut novels